Pietro Pompeo Sales (Brescia, 1729 – Hanau, 21 November 1797) was an Italian composer.

Compositions

Operas 
Massinissa, oder Die obsiegende Treu (dramma gesuita, 1752, Innsbruck)
Le cinesi (componimento drammatico, libretto di Pietro Metastasio, 1757, Augsburg)
L'isola disabitata (azione teatrale, libretto di Pietro Metastasio, 1758, Augusta)
Le nozze di Amore e di Norizia (opera seria, libretto di Giunti, 1765, Teatro Cuvilliés di Munich)
Antigona in Tebe (opera seria, 1767, Padova)
L'Antigono (opera seria, libretto di Pietro Metastasio, 1769, Munich)
Achille in Sciro (opera seria, libretto di Pietro Metastasio e A. Savioli, 1774, Munich)
Il re pastore (opera seria, libretto di Pietro Metastasio)

Oratorios 
Oratorio per la festa del Santo Natale (libretto di Pietro Metastasio, 1756, Augusta)
Die Leiden unseres Herrn Jesu Christ (Augusta)
Giefte (libretto di Mattia Verazi, 1762, Mannheim)
La Passione di Gesù Christo (libretto di Pietro Metastasio, 1772, Ehrenbreitstein)
Heu quid egisti (1774, Monaco)
Isacco figura del redentore (libretto di Pietro Metastasio, 1778, Ehrenbreitstein)
Giuseppe riconosciuto (libretto di Pietro Metastasio, 1780, Ehrenbreitstein)
Gioàs, re di Giudia (libretto di Pietro Metastasio, 1781)
La Betulia liberata (libretto di Pietro Metastasio, 1783, Ehrenbreitstein)
Affectus amantis (1784, Ehrenbreitstein)
Sant'Elena al Calvario (libretto di Pietro Metastasio, 1790, Ehrenbreitstein)

Sacred music
Missa solemnis in do magg.
Messa in do magg.
Messa in fa-re magg. (Kyrie e Gloria)
Missa solemnis in re magg.
2 Litaniae lauretanae
Currite accedite (offertorio)
Ecce panis angelorum (offertorio)
Ave maris stella
Mi deus ego amo te
Salutis humani
Tantum ergo
Salve regina

Instrumental music 
5 sinfonie (re magg., re magg., fa magg., sol magg. sol magg.)
Serenata
Concerto per flauto in re magg.
3 concerti per clavicembalo (do magg., fa magg., sol magg.)
Concerto per 2 clavicembali in sol magg.
Partita (dubbia, attribuita anche a Christian Cannabich)
Sonata per clavicembalo
Trio in sol magg. per clavicembalo, violino e violoncello
Notturno per 2 violini e violoncello

References

1729 births
1797 deaths